The 2016 Hungarian Canoeing Championships were the .... edition of the Hungarian Canoeing Championships (which took place on 14–16 July 2016 on the Holt-Tisza in Szolnok.

Results

Men's events

Canoe

Kayak

Women's events

Canoe

Kayak

See also
2018 Hungarian Canoe Sprint Championships
Hungarian Canoeing Championships
Hungarian Canoe Federation

References

External links 
 Official website 

2016 in canoeing
Canoeing Championships
Hungarian Canoe Sprint Championships